Brigitte Maillard (1954 – 14 August 2021) was a French poet, writer, and singer.

Biography
In 2004, Maillard began to explore a career in poetry. She created the site Monde en poésie, subtitled Pour que vivent la poésie le monde et les mots pour le dire, in 2008.

Maillard died in Quimper on 14 August 2021 at the age of 66.

Bibliography
La simple évidence de la beauté (2011)
Soleil, vivant soleil (2013)
À l'éveil du jour (2015)
L'Au-delà du monde (2017)
La simple évidence de la beauté (2019)
Il y a un chemin (2019)
Le Mystère des choses inexplicables (2021)

References

1954 births
2021 deaths
21st-century French women singers